HVOB (for Her Voice Over Boys) is an Austrian electronic duo founded in Vienna by Anna Müller and Paul Wallner.

Biography
Anna Müller and Paul Wallner founded HVOB in 2012. The duo focuses on "restrained and minimalist" electronica with the use of vocals. After releasing music on SoundCloud they were discovered by Oliver Koletzki, a German dance and house music producer. Koletzki contracted the duo and they later appeared at the Melt! Festival. Their first EP Dogs was released in 2012.

In 2013, the band released its first album HVOB. Their second album Trialog released in 2015 was said by American Thump magazine "as a contender for an 'Album of the Year' award".

In 2015, the duo toured India and went to various cities including Bangalore. The duo has been "voted as one of the best live acts in the world".

In 2017, the group released their third album, Silk, with collaborator Winston Marshall. Jamie McNamara of BeatRoute describe the first track on the album as "moody atmosphere and guitar-led dance music". In 2018 the group performed a sold out show at the Mezzanine in San Francisco.

In 2019, the group released their fourth album, Rocco.

In 2021, the group released the single Bruise, and announced a release of a new album TOO set for April 2022.

Discography
 HVOB (2013)
 Trialog (2015)
 Silk (2017)
 Rocco (2019)
 TOO (2022)

References

External links
 Official website
 

Musical groups from Vienna
Musical groups established in 2012
Austrian electronic music groups
2012 establishments in Austria
Austrian musical duos
Electronic music duos
Male–female musical duos